Laciniaria plicata is a species of small air-breathing land snail, a terrestrial pulmonate gastropod mollusk in the family Clausiliidae, the door snails.

Subspecies
 Laciniaria plicata coarctata A. Schmidt, 1868
 Laciniaria plicata costigera H. Nordsieck, 2008
 Laciniaria plicata excepta (A. Schmidt, 1868)
 Laciniaria plicata kueprijae H. Nordsieck, 1973
 Laciniaria plicata plicata (Draparnaud, 1801)
 Laciniaria plicata rhodopensis H. Nordsieck, 2008
 Laciniaria plicata transsylvanica (M. Kimakowicz, 1883)
 Laciniaria plicata valkanovi Urbański, 1964

Distribution
This species occurs in:
 Bulgaria
 Czech Republic
 Poland
 Slovakia
 Ukraine
 and other areas

References

 Kerney, M.P., Cameron, R.A.D. & Jungbluth, J-H. (1983). Die Landschnecken Nord- und Mitteleuropas. Ein Bestimmungsbuch für Biologen und Naturfreunde, 384 pp., 24 plates
 Bank, R. A.; Neubert, E. (2017). Checklist of the land and freshwater Gastropoda of Europe. Last update: July 16th, 2017
 Sysoev, A. V. & Schileyko, A. A. (2009). Land snails and slugs of Russia and adjacent countries. Sofia/Moskva (Pensoft). 312 pp., 142 plates.

External links
 Draparnaud, J.-P.-R. (1801). Tableau des mollusques terrestres et fluviatiles de la France. Montpellier / Paris (Renaud / Bossange, Masson & Besson). 1-116

Clausiliidae
Gastropods described in 1801